North Carolina's 5th Senate district is one of 50 districts in the North Carolina Senate. It has been represented by Democrat Kandie Smith since 2023.

Geography
Since 2019, the district has covered all of Edgecombe and Pitt counties. The district overlaps with the 8th, 9th, and 23rd state house districts.

District officeholders since 1989

Election results

2022

2020

2018

2016

2014

2012

2010

2008

2006

2004

2002

2000

References

North Carolina Senate districts
Edgecombe County, North Carolina
Pitt County, North Carolina